The 1949 Xavier Musketeers football team was an American football team that represented Xavier University as an independent during the 1949 college football season. In its third season under head coach Ed Kluska, the team compiled a 10–1 record, defeated Arizona State in the 1950 Salad Bowl, and outscored all opponents by a total of 257 to 110. The team's only loss was to Bear Bryant's 1949 Kentucky Wildcats football team that was ranked No. 11 in the final AP Poll.

Schedule

References

Xavier
Xavier Musketeers football seasons
Salad Bowl champion seasons
Xavier Musketeers football